Denis Vladimirovich Pushilin (born 9 May 1981) is a politician from the Donbas region, who is serving as the Head of the Donetsk People's Republic (DPR) since 2018. He holds the position in acting capacity ever since the Russian annexation of the DPR in 2022.

He had previously served as Chairman of the People's Council, and became the acting head of state and government following the assassination of incumbent Alexander Zakharchenko amidst the conflict in the east Ukraine region. He successfully ran for election to a full term in the controversial 2018 elections. Pushilin's role in MMM Global prior to his political career is cited by critics that describe him as a fraudster who was involved in a Ponzi scheme.

Early life
Pushilin was born 9 May 1981 in Makiivka, Donetsk Oblast, in the Ukrainian Soviet Socialist Republic. Pushilin is the son of workers of the Makiivka Metallurgical Factory, Vladimir Pushilin and Valentina Khasanova. He graduated in 1998 from Makiivka Lyceum No. 1, a school combining secondary and professional education. From 1999 to 2000, he served in the National Guard of Ukraine in a special assignment battalion in Crimea. After leaving the military, he studied Enterprise Economics at Donbas National Academy of Civil Engineering and Architecture, but did not receive a degree. From 2002 to 2006, Pushilin worked for a trading firm, Solodkye Zhittya ("Sweet Life”).

MMM involvement
From 1989 to 1994, a Russian Ponzi scheme called MMM cost its participants millions of dollars prior to disbanding. In 2011, Sergei Mavrodi launched a new MMM. Pushilin volunteered for this successor company from 2011 to 2013 and became a key leader. The new MMM openly admitted to being a pyramid scheme. Pushilin was not shy in promoting involvement with the company.

The Ministry of Justice of Ukraine allowed registration of the MMM Party under the chairmanship of Mavrodi. It is interpreted as an abbreviation for "We Have a Goal". Pushilin joined this new party in 2012. Opposing Yanukovych and unknown in the Kyiv region, Pushilin got 0.08% of the votes and failed to win a seat in the December 2013 repeat elections of the 2012 Ukrainian parliamentary election in the 94th district (located in Obukhiv). According to his December 2013 election information, Pushilin was "not working" at the time.

Donetsk politics

Early separatism and sanctions

On 5 April 2014, Pushilin led a rally in Donetsk, identifying himself as deputy to Pavel Gubarev, the "People's Governor" of Donetsk. Pushilin demanded a referendum, like that of Crimea, on the question independence from the new Ukrainian government in Kyiv.

By the end of April, the European Union (EU) had placed sanctions on Pushilin, which included freezing assets and banning him from entering EU member states. In June, the United States added Pushilin to the Specially Designated Nationals and Blocked Persons List. His name has since been added to sanction lists of Australia, Canada, Norway, Liechtenstein and Switzerland.

Chairman of the Supreme Council
On 19 May 2014, Pushilin became the Chairman of the Supreme Council of the Donetsk People's Republic, and under the draft constitution adopted on May 15, the new republic's head of state. In June 2014, he announced that DPR businesses which engaged in tax evasion would be nationalized. Pushilin did not envision the Donetsk People's Republic becoming an independent state but preferred to join the Russian Federation (which he saw as a potential renewed Russian Empire).

Pushilin survived two assassination attempts, both occurring within a week on the 7th and 12th of June 2014. Pushilin was in Moscow on those dates, as was widely reported at the time.

Pushilin resigned from his post of the Chairman of the Donetsk People's Republic in July 2014. From 14 November 2014 to 4 September 2015, he served as a vice-chairman of the Donetsk People's Republic Council then he replaced Andrei Purgin and became the Chairman of the council once again.

From 2014 to 2018, Pushilin officially represented the DPR at the Trilateral Contact Group and the Minsk II agreements. The Minsk II agreements subsequently failed, with each side accusing the other of violating the ceasefire terms.

Head of the Donetsk People's Republic
On 31 August 2018, DPR leader Alexander Zakharchenko was assassinated in a bombing of a restaurant in Donetsk. After a week-long interim leadership by Dmitry Trapeznikov, Pushilin was appointed acting Head of the DPR on 7 September 2018; he was to hold this position until elections on 11 November 2018.

On 21 September 2018, he submitted documents to be registered in the November election. He won with 60.85% of the vote. On 6 December 2021 Pushilin became a member of the Russian ruling party United Russia. United Russia chairman Dmitry Medvedev personally handed him his party ticket during the party's annual congress in Moscow.

Russian invasion of Ukraine and Russian annexation of the Donetsk People's Republic 

On 21 February 2022, Pushilin signed an agreement for friendship, cooperation, and mutual assistance between the Donetsk People's Republic and the Russian Federation. At this ceremony were also signed an agreement between the LPR and Russia, and executive orders by President Putin to officially recognize the independence of the DPR and LPR.

In April 2022, news outlets noted that during Pushilin's visit to Mariupol, he awarded Senior Lieutenant Roman Vorobyov a medal, while he was wearing patches affiliated with neo-Nazism: the Totenkopf used by the 3rd SS Panzer Division, and the valknut.

In September 2022, Pushilin suggested coordinating a joint referendum with Luhansk People's Republic leader Leonid Pasechnik on the question of joining the Russian Federation. The referendum, also organised in the Kherson and Zaporizhzhia provinces, received widespread international condemnation, and passed in Donetsk with over 99% approval, according to official figures. Pushilin said in an interview with TASS that he would be heading to Moscow with the final protocol of a recent referendum on joining Russia "to formalize reunification." On September 30, Pushilin attended in Moscow the ceremony in which Vladimir Putin formally announced the annexation of the Donetsk, Kherson, Luhansk and Zaporizhzhia oblasts, together with the other pro-Russian occupation heads Volodymyr Saldo, Leonid Pasechnik and Yevgeny Balitsky.

References

External links
 
 

1981 births
Living people
People from Makiivka
Pro-Russian people of the 2014 pro-Russian unrest in Ukraine
People of the Donetsk People's Republic
Pro-Russian people of the war in Donbas
People of the National Guard of Ukraine
United Russia politicians
Ukrainian collaborators with Russia
Individuals designated as terrorist by the government of Ukraine
Russian individuals subject to European Union sanctions
Russian individuals subject to the U.S. Department of the Treasury sanctions
Specially Designated Nationals and Blocked Persons List
Anti-Ukrainian sentiment in Ukraine
Russian Military leaders of the 2022 Russo-Ukrainian War